Civic Guard may refer to:

 Garde Civique, Belgium (1830-1920)
 Garda Síochána, Ireland
 Schutterij, Netherlands

See also
Civil Guard (disambiguation)